The 1991–92 NBA season was the fourth season of the Miami Heat in the National Basketball Association (NBA). The Heat had the fifth overall pick in the 1991 NBA draft, and selected Steve Smith out of Michigan State, and hired Kevin Loughery as their new head coach after the resignation of Ron Rothstein prior to the start of season. The Heat got off to a fast start winning seven of their first ten games, but lost 8 of their next 9 games along the way. After holding out most of the 91–92 season only playing in just five games, the Heat traded Sherman Douglas to the Boston Celtics in exchange for Brian Shaw. The team held a 23–25 record at the All-Star break, as Loughery coached the Heat to their first ever playoff appearance in franchise history, as they finished fourth in the Atlantic Division with a 38–44 record, winning a tie-breaker for the #8 seed in the Eastern Conference over the Atlanta Hawks.

The Heat also managed to hold down the home court quite well during the season, posting a 28–13 record at the Miami Arena. Glen Rice led all Heat scorers averaging 22.3 points per game, while Rony Seikaly averaged 16.4 points and 11.8 rebounds per game, and Grant Long provided the team with 14.8 points, 8.4 rebounds and 1.7 steals per game. Smith averaged 12.0 points and 4.6 assists per game, and was selected to the NBA All-Rookie First Team, while second-year forward Willie Burton provided with 11.2 points per game, and Kevin Edwards and second-year guard Bimbo Coles both contributed 10.1 points per game each.

However, in the Eastern Conference First Round of Eastern Conference Playoffs, the Heat were swept in three straight games by Michael Jordan, and his defending world champion Chicago Bulls, who were coming off a 67–win regular season. The Bulls would defeat the Portland Trail Blazers in six games in the NBA Finals, winning their second consecutive championship.

On December 17, 1991, the Heat suffered a 68-point road loss to the Cleveland Cavaliers, 148–80 as the Cavaliers had set an NBA record with the second largest margin of victory in a game.

Draft picks

Roster

Regular season

Season standings

y – clinched division title
x – clinched playoff spot

z – clinched division title
y – clinched division title
x – clinched playoff spot

Record vs. opponents

Playoffs

|- align="center" bgcolor="#ffcccc"
| 1
| April 24
| @ Chicago
| L 94–113
| Steve Smith (19)
| Rony Seikaly (11)
| Steve Smith (7)
| Chicago Stadium18,676
| 0–1
|- align="center" bgcolor="#ffcccc"
| 2
| April 26
| @ Chicago
| L 90–120
| Rony Seikaly (26)
| Rony Seikaly (7)
| Bimbo Coles (4)
| Chicago Stadium18,676
| 0–2
|- align="center" bgcolor="#ffcccc"
| 3
| April 29
| Chicago
| L 114–119
| Glen Rice (25)
| Rony Seikaly (12)
| Shaw, Smith (6)
| Miami Arena15,008
| 0–3
|-

Player statistics

Awards and records
 Steve Smith, NBA All-Rookie Team 1st Team

Transactions

References

 Heat on Database Basketball

Miami Heat seasons
Miami
Miami Heat
Miami Heat